Many philanthropic, charitable and other not-for-profit foundations are established in Vaduz, Liechtenstein. Liechtenstein is a minimum-tax state with strict laws to protect the privacy of its foundations. Foundations established in Vaduz are guaranteed the privacy of their assets.

The list 

 The Alexander S. Onassis Foundation *1973
 The International Lottery in Liechtenstein Foundation
 The International Music and Art Foundation *1988
 The Prince of Liechtenstein Foundation *1970
 The Marcala Foundation
 The Thesaurus Islamicus Foundation
 The European Centre of Austrian Economics Foundation *2004
 The Rothschild-Crutchfield Foundation
 The IKEA Foundation
 The Hilti Family Foundation

See also
Economy of Liechtenstein
Tax haven
Vaduz

Notes 

Economy of Liechtenstein
Foundations based in Liechtenstein